Suadiye railway station is a station on the Marmaray cross-city rail service in the mostly residential neighbourhood of Suadiye  in Kadıköy, Istanbul. 

The old station was a stop on the Haydarpaşa suburban commuter line from 1951 to 2013. It was built in 1910 by the Ottoman Anatolian Railway (CFOA), as the neighbourhood began to expand in the late 1900s and still survives alongside the new replacement station.

The new station opened, belatedly, for service in 2019.

References

Railway stations in Istanbul Province
Railway stations opened in 1910
1910 establishments in the Ottoman Empire
Transport in Kadıköy